Jack Odur Lutanywa is a Ugandan politician who Served as Member of Parliament of Kibanda South County in Kiryandong District in The Tenth Parliament of Uganda. He lost to Karubanga Jacob Atenyi in the 2021 Parliamentary Elections of Kibanda South constituency.

In 2020 Jack Odur Lutanywa tabled before Parliament a Constitutional Amendment Bill seeking the recognition of the Maragoli as one of the indigenous tribes in Uganda.

References 

Ugandan politicians
Living people
Kiryandongo District
Year of birth missing (living people)